Neil James Elshire (born March 8, 1958) is a former professional American football player who played defensive end for six seasons for the Minnesota Vikings.

Career 
Attended University of Oregon. 6'6" 260 lbs (198cm 117kg) Defensive End. In his six seasons with the Vikings, 81-86, Elshire tallied his career high in sacks with 9.5 with a total of 19 in his career, he also recorded one safety.

Personal life 
He is currently the defensive coordinator for the Mountain View High School football team in Bend, Oregon, where he resides with his wife and five children. His son Erik Elshire played football for the University of Oregon from 2005 to 2008 and is now pursuing a doctorate in Education Policy at the University of Illinois Chicago, while Neil's four daughters excel in a variety of other disciplines.

References

1958 births
Living people
Sportspeople from Salem, Oregon
Players of American football from Oregon
American football defensive ends
Oregon Ducks football players
Minnesota Vikings players